Stephen Clark Foster (December 24, 1799 – October 5, 1872) was a United States representative from Maine.  He was born in Machias, Massachusetts (now in Maine). He attended the common schools, learned the blacksmith's trade and subsequently became a shipbuilder.

He was elected as a member of the Maine State House of Representatives 1834–1837, elected as a member of the Maine State Senate in 1840, and serving as its president, and again elected to the Maine House of Representatives in 1847. He was elected as a Republican to the 35th and 36th United States Congress (March 4, 1857 – March 3, 1861).

He was a member of the Peace Convention of 1861 held in Washington, D.C., in an effort to devise means to prevent the impending US Civil War.  He died in Pembroke, Maine on October 5, 1872.  His interment is in Forest Hill Cemetery.

References

1799 births
1872 deaths
Republican Party members of the Maine House of Representatives
Presidents of the Maine Senate
Republican Party Maine state senators
People from Machias, Maine
Republican Party members of the United States House of Representatives from Maine
19th-century American politicians
People from Pembroke, Maine